Cofield is a village in Hertford County, North Carolina, United States. The population was 413 at the 2010 census.

History
Deane House was listed on the National Register of Historic Places in 1982.

Geography
Cofield is located at  (36.357424, -76.908672).

Demographics

As of the census of 2000, there were 347 people, 145 households, and 90 families residing in the village. The population density was 111.1 people per square mile (42.9/km2). There were 168 housing units at an average density of 53.8 per square mile (20.8/km2). The racial makeup of the village was 13.54% White, 80.69% African American, 3.46% Native American, 1.73% from other races, and 0.58% from two or more races. Hispanic or Latino of any race were 3.46% of the population.

There were 145 households, out of which 29.7% had children under the age of 18 living with them, 37.9% were married couples living together, 19.3% had a female householder with no husband present, and 37.9% were non-families. 31.7% of all households were made up of individuals, and 14.5% had someone living alone who was 65 years of age or older. The average household size was 2.39 and the average family size was 2.99.

In the village, the population was spread out, with 23.6% under the age of 18, 7.5% from 18 to 24, 28.2% from 25 to 44, 25.6% from 45 to 64, and 15.0% who were 65 years of age or older. The median age was 40 years. For every 100 females, there were 79.8 males. For every 100 females age 18 and over, there were 81.5 males.

The median income for a household in the village was $18,214, and the median income for a family was $27,969. Males had a median income of $28,250 versus $17,125 for females. The per capita income for the village was $11,810. About 23.8% of families and 26.5% of the population were below the poverty line, including 32.7% of those under age 18 and 33.9% of those age 65 or over.

References

External links
 A history and many stories about Cofield and its people are found at www.roanoke-chowan.com.

Villages in Hertford County, North Carolina
Villages in North Carolina